Andikkadu is a village in the Pattukkottai taluk of Thanjavur district, Tamil Nadu, India. Famous advocate Mr.R.Balasubramanian better known as R.B. was born here. Mr.R.Srinivasa Iyer who was M.L.A. Of Pattukottai from 1957-62 belongs to Andikadu; Mr.R.Krishnamurthy Iyer , who was a famous Mirasdar cum philanthropist also belongs to this area. They are brothers.

Demographics 
As per the 2001 census, Andikkadu had a total population of 1271 with 653 males and 618 females. The sex ratio was 946. The literacy rate was 78.

References 
 
 

Villages in Thanjavur district